Ferrari Ki Sawaari is a 2012 Indian sports comedy-drama film written and directed by Rajesh Mapuskar, and produced by Vidhu Vinod Chopra. It stars Sharman Joshi, Boman Irani and Ritvik Sahore in the lead roles. The film was released on 15 June 2012 with generally positive reviews.

Plot
A little boy, Kayo (Ritvik Sahore) thinks of nothing but playing cricket. His father, Rusy (Sharman Joshi), a head clerk thinks of nothing but his little boy. Kayo's school organises a cricket camp which would send students to Lord's Cricket Ground in London and would get him a chance to play with his idol Sachin Tendulkar , but Rusy doesn't have enough money. To fulfill his son's dream of playing at the Lord's Cricket Ground, the honest and upright Rusy performs his first small act of dishonesty: he steals the gleaming red Ferrari owned by Sachin Tendulkar, for one day. The only problem is he doesn't inform its legendary owner. A wild, breathless, bumpy ride begins, a ride that leads to a menagerie of amazing characters: a wedding planner who'll stop at nothing, a Laurel-and-Hardyesque pair of loyal attendants, a greedy politician and his reckless son and a mechanic who specializes in stolen cars. As the Ferrari zooms through this chaotic world of street-thugs and mass-weddings, another saga unfolds – a grumpy old man and his secret wounds, and an epic rivalry that goes back thirty-eight years.

Cast
 Sharman Joshi as Rustom "Rusy" Behram Deboo
 Boman Irani as  Behram Ardeshir Deboo, Rusy's father and Kayo's grandfather.
 Ritvik Sahore as Kayoze "Kayo" Rustom Deboo, Rusy's son and Behram's grandson
 Seema Pahwa as Babbu Didi
 Aakash Dabhade as Mohan  (Sachin Tendulkar's servant)
 Deepak Shirke as Mahavir Tambe aka Mama (Sachin Tendulkar's watchman)
 Paresh Rawal as Dilip Dharmadhikari (cameo)
 Satyadeep Mishra as Kayo's cricket coach Vilayat
 Achyut Potdar as Shop owner
 Bhalchandra Kadam as Shamshu Bhai (Garage owner)
 Uday Sabnis as Inspector
 Vijay Nikam as Tatyasaheb Mandke (Corporator)
 Nilesh Diwekar as Prakash "Pakya"
 Vidya Balan in a Special appearance in Song - "Mala Jau De"
 girdhar swami Casting director

Production

Rajesh Mapuskar has worked as an associate director on films such as 3 Idiots (2009) and Lage Raho Munna Bhai (2006); in fact the idea of the film came to him during the post-production work of Lage Raho Munna Bhai, when for an advertising assignment he went out looking for expensive cars in Mumbai, he found them all except a Ferrari. Eventually he managed to track a Ferrari parked at Pali Hill. This gave him the idea, "What if I steal this car for a day? What will happen?", which developed into the idea of Sachin Tendulkar's Ferrari and the script was developed over the next seven and a half years along with Vidhu Vinod Chopra.

Music

The background music is composed by Tapas Relia while the soundtrack is composed by Pritam. The album contains seven original tracks. The lyrics are penned by Swanand Kirkire, Amitabh Bhattacharya, Guru Thakur and duo of Satyanshu & Devanshu Singh.

Madhu Soodha of Goarticles.com noted "The soundtrack of "Ferrari Ki Sawaari" does not take you on a rollercoaster ride, but with five lyricists at his helm, Pritam has managed to dole out a decent album. It has an array of tracks, which can manage to generate a happy and positive response from listeners."

Track listing

Reception

Critical reception
The movie received favorable reviews from critics for its storyline and performances. Subhash K. Jha of IANS gave it 3 out 5 stars and said, "The dialogues in Ferrari Ki Sawaari lack the punch of Hirani's Munnabhai films but the heart is still in the right place. Honestly, the film is hard to dislike. It has moments of immense warmth and humour." Rajeev Masand of CNN IBN gave 2.5/5 stars and mentioned that "it would have been a good movie if was kept short." Taran Adarsh of Bollywood Hungama gave it 3.5 out 5 stars, saying that "This heartwarming, tender and sprightly film should not be missed!". Rediff gave the movie 2.5 stars out of 5. Rachit Gupta of Filmfare gave a rating of 4 stars out of 5. He said,"Ferrari Ki Sawaari is a well constructed film that switches between drama and comedy with ease. Hirani's dialogue is pitch-perfect." Madhureeta Mukherjee of Times of India gave it 4 stars out of five, with Kunal Guha of Yahoo! Movies and Sonia Chopra of Sify giving 1.5 and 3 stars out of five respectively.

Box office

India
Ferrari Ki Sawaari collected  nett approx. on day one. Ferrari Ki Sawaari grossed  nett approx in week two.

OverseasFerrari Ki Sawaari'' collected around $650,000 in overseas which is decent for a non-star cast film but considering the near 250 screen release it is a low figure. The collections from major markets are as follows: UK - £80,000; North America (Canada & USA) - $240,000; UAE - $150,000; Australia - $32,000.

References

External links

 
 
 

2012 films
2010s sports comedy-drama films
2010s Hindi-language films
Films about cricket in India
Films featuring songs by Pritam
Indian sports comedy-drama films
2012 directorial debut films
Sachin Tendulkar